The discography of Japanese R&B singer Misia consists of nine studio albums, three compilation albums, one extended play (EP), one live album, six remix albums, twenty-six singles (including one as a featured artist), twelve promotional singles, eighteen video albums and thirty-seven music videos. In 1997, Misia signed a recording contract with BMG Japan and joined the then up-and-coming talent agency, Rhythmedia. Under the sub-label Arista Japan, Misia released her first single, "Tsutsumikomu Yō ni..." in February 1998, followed by "Hi no Ataru Basho" in May. In June, her debut album, Mother Father Brother Sister, opened at number three on the Oricon chart. The album peaked at number one three weeks later and stayed in the top five for eleven consecutive weeks. Mother Father Brother Sister was certified double million and won a Japan Record Award for Best Album, as well as a Japan Gold Disc Award for Pop Album of the Year. In 2000, Misia's second studio album, Love Is the Message, debuted at number one and was certified double million. It won a Japan Record Award for Best Album and a Japan Gold Disc Award for Pop Album of the Year. The album spawned three top ten hits: "Believe," "Wasurenai Hibi" and "Sweetness." Misia's first remix album, Misia Remix 2000 Little Tokyo, was released three months later and shot to number one. It sold over 800,000 copies and is the second best-selling remix album of all time in Japan.

In October 2000, Misia released "Everything." The single debuted atop the Oricon chart, becoming Misia's first number one hit. "Everything" is Misia's most successful single: it won a Japan Gold Disc Award for Song of the Year and, with 1.9 million copies sold in Japan alone, it is the fourth best-selling single of all time by a female artist and the best-selling single of the decade by a female artist. Misia's third studio album, Marvelous, was released in 2001. In addition to "Everything", the album produced two more top ten singles: "Escape" and "I Miss You (Toki o Koete)," Misia's collaboration song with Dreams Come True. The album was certified million and was the second best-selling studio album of the year. It won a Japan Gold Disc Award for Pop Album of the Year. In October 2001, Misia and Rhythmedia parted ways with BMG and partnered with Avex to form their own label, Rhythmedia Tribe. In March 2002, BMG released Misia's first compilation album, Misia Greatest Hits. The album spent two consecutive weeks at number one and sold over 1.9 million copies, becoming the thirtieth best-selling compilation album of all time in Japan, as well as the fourth best-selling album of the year. The compilation album won a Japan Gold Disc Award for Pop Album of the Year and is Misia's third release to be certified double million. Six months later, Misia released her fourth studio album, Kiss in the Sky, which also debuted atop of the Oricon chart, tying Misia with Namie Amuro and Mai Kuraki as the fourth female artist with the longest streak of number one albums since their debut, behind BoA, Hikaru Utada and Ayumi Hamasaki. The album stayed two weeks at number one and was certified million It won a Japan Gold Disc Award for Pop Album of the Year. Kiss in the Sky yielded three singles: "Hatenaku Tsuzuku Story," Misia's first release under Rhythmedia Tribe, "Nemurenu Yoru wa Kimi no Sei," her second number one single, and "Back Blocks," her first recut single. Misia was the third highest-selling act of 2002.

In 2004, Misia released two albums that both peaked at number three and reached platinum certification: her fifth studio album, Mars & Roses, and the concept album, Singer for Singer. Three years later, she released her seventh and last studio album under the Avex partnership, Ascension, which peaked at number two on the Oricon chart and was certified gold. Later that year, Misia signed back with former record label BMG Japan and released her seventeenth single, "Any Love," which became her first top ten hit in three years. In 2008, Misia released her eighth studio album, Eighth World, which was certified gold. In 2009, Misia released her ninth and first studio album to feature mainly ballads, Just Ballade. It debuted at number four and was certified gold. Its lead single, "Aitakute Ima," was chosen as theme song for the anticipated TV drama, Jin, and peaked at number nine on the Oricon chart, making it Misia's first top ten hit since "Royal Chocolate Flush" in 2007. The song has sold over one million downloads since its release and was certified triple platinum in download sales. As a result of its popularity with viewers and critics alike, it won the Television Drama Academy Award for Best Drama Song. Misia's tenth studio album, Soul Quest, was released on July 27, 2011. Its only physical single, "Kioku," was released on May 25, 2011.

Studio albums

Cover albums

Extended plays

Compilation albums

Live album

Remix albums

Singles

As a lead artist

As a featured artist

Promotional singles

Video albums

Live concerts

Music video collections

Music videos

Other appearances

Notes

References 

Discography
Discographies of Japanese artists
Rhythm and blues discographies